Yevhen Oleksandrovych Arzhanov (born 9 February 1948) is a Ukrainian former middle-distance runner who won a silver medal in the 800 metres at the 1972 Summer Olympics.

Arzhanov was a keen basketball and football player, and took up athletics only in 1965, yet by 1968 he was selected for the Soviet national team. At the 1968 Olympics, he reached the semifinals, and next year finished fourth at the 1969 European Championships. He won gold medals at the 1970 European Indoor Championships with a time of 1:51.0, 1971 European Indoor Championships (1:48.7), 1971 European Championships (1:45.6) and 1973 Summer Universiade (1:46.9).

At the 1972 Olympics Arzhanov led the final, but was narrowly overtaken in the last meters by Dave Wottle, who finished in the same time (1:45.9).

After retiring from competitions, Arzhanov worked as athletics commentator with Ukrainian national television and radio stations. After the fall of the Soviet Union, he coached the national teams of South Korea and Vietnam.

References 

1948 births
Living people
People from Kalush, Ukraine
Athletes (track and field) at the 1968 Summer Olympics
Athletes (track and field) at the 1972 Summer Olympics
Dynamo sports society athletes
Ukrainian male middle-distance runners
Olympic athletes of the Soviet Union
Olympic silver medalists for the Soviet Union
Soviet male middle-distance runners
European Athletics Championships medalists
Medalists at the 1972 Summer Olympics
Olympic silver medalists in athletics (track and field)
Universiade medalists in athletics (track and field)
Universiade gold medalists for the Soviet Union
Sportspeople from Ivano-Frankivsk Oblast